The 3rd Special Operations Squadron flies MQ-9 Reaper Remotely Piloted Aircraft and is currently located at Cannon Air Force Base, New Mexico. The squadron is under the command of the Air Force Special Operations Command.

History

World War I
Organized in France in April 1918, the Photographic Section No. 1 processed aerial photographs taken by flying units working with the I Corps (American) and the French 38th Army Corps, 5 April–November 1918.

Inter-war years
The 1st Photographic Section, from September 1919 until becoming the 3rd Observation Squadron on 1 June 1937, processed aerial photography of associated observation squadrons in Texas.

World War II
At Langley Field, Virginia, the squadron engaged in aerial observation work with the Coast Artillery School until April 1942. It supported ground forces on maneuvers during 1942, and served as a training and demonstration unit January 1943 – February 1944. The squadron was not manned or equipped, 1 Mar – 2 July 1944.

Strategic Reconnaissance
Activated again in May 1952 under Strategic Air Command as part of its global reconnaissance mission. The squadron did not receive its first aircraft until 1 July 1953, when it immediately began familiarization training, followed by in-flight refueling training in February 1954. It received Boeing RB-47E Stratojet aircraft in March 1954, and conducted its first long-range mission (6 planes to Alaska for 10 days) in May 1954. The squadron deployed at RAF Upper Heyford, England, 14 September – 3 November 1954. Some of these flights were mounted from Thule in Greenland and probed deep into the heart of the Soviet Union, taking a photographic and radar recording of the route attacking SAC bombers would follow to reach their targets. Flights which involved penetrating mainland Russia were termed SENSINT (Sensitive Intelligence) missions. One RB-47 even managed to fly 450 miles inland and photograph the city of Igarka in Siberia. It photographed numerous Air Force bases and American cities, 1954–1958, and participated regularly in SAC exercises. Missions flown on a reduced scale after February 1958 when events showed the vulnerability of the RB-47 to Soviet air defenses and the development of the U-2 aircraft. Became non-operational, 15 April – 1 July 1958. when it inactivated.

Vietnam War
As the 3rd Air Commando Squadron in South Vietnam, it absorbed resources of the 14th Air Commando Squadron. It flew combat missions in Douglas AC-47D gunships in close air support of ground forces, providing flare illumination and gunfire in support of strategic hamlets, out¬posts, and friendly forces under night attack. From 16 February – 1 May 1969, all squadron aircraft were maintained on ground alert when not flying, due to the Tet (New Year) offensive. It began transferring its gunships to the Vietnamese Air Force in June 1969 and flew its last mission on 7 August 1969.

Electronic warfare training
The 3rd Tactical Electronic Warfare Training Squadron was not equipped with aircraft. Rather, it operated Camp O'Donnell, Philippines, the Pacific Air Forces Electronic Warfare Range, the Crow Valley Aerial Gunnery Range, and associated facilities. It provided realistic conventional, tactical, and electronic warfare training in a simulated combat environment during Cope Thunder exercises. These exercises provided combat training for fighter aircrews of not only the U.S. Air Force, but also fighter crews of the US Marine Corps, US Navy, and allied air forces in the western Pacific area. Following the eruption of Mt Pinatubo in June 1991, personnel were evacuated, and the squadron remained unmanned until its inactivation.

Special operations
Provided remotely piloted aircraft support to special operations forces, 2005 – present.

Lineage
 Photographic Section No. 1
 Organized as Photographic Section No. 1 on 4 April 1918
 Demobilized on 3 July 1919
 Reconstituted and consolidated with the 1st Photographic Section as the 1st Photographic Section on 23 March 1924

 3rd Strategic Reconnaissance Squadron
 Authorized as the 1st Photographic Section on 15 August 1919
 Organized on 27 September 1919
 Consolidated with Photographic Section No. 1 on 23 March 1924
 Redesignated 3rd Observation Squadron on 1 June 1937
 Redesignated 3rd Observation Squadron (Medium) on 13 January 1942
 Redesignated 3rd Observation Squadron on 4 July 1942
 Redesignated 3rd Tactical Reconnaissance Squadron on 11 August 1943
 Disbanded on 2 July 1944
 Reconstituted and redesignated 3rd Strategic Reconnaissance Squadron, Medium on 9 May 1952
 Activated on 28 May 1952
 Inactivated on 1 July 1958
 Consolidated with the 3rd Special Operations Squadron and the 3rd Tactical Electronic Warfare Training Squadron as the 3rd Tactical Electronic Warfare Training Squadron on 19 September 1985

 3rd Air Commando Squadron
 Constituted as the 3rd Air Commando Squadron and activated on 5 April 1968 (not organized)
 Organized on 1 May 1968
 Redesignated 3rd Special Operations Squadron on 1 August 1968
 Inactivated on 15 September 1969
 Consolidated with the 3rd Strategic Reconnaissance Squadron and the 3rd Tactical Electronic Warfare Training Squadron as the 3rd Tactical Electronic Warfare Training Squadron on 19 September 1985

 3rd Special Operations Squadron
 Constituted as the 3rd Tactical Electronic Warfare Training Squadron on 13 May 1976
 Activated on 15 May 1976
 Consolidated with the 3rd Strategic Reconnaissance Squadron and the 3rd Special Operations Squadron on 19 September 1985
 Inactivated on 30 September 1991
 Redesignated 3rd Special Operations Squadron on 20 October 2005
 Activated on 28 October 2005

Assignments
 I Corps Observation Group, April 1918
 First Army Observation Group, November 1918 – April 1919
 Unknown, – 3 April July 1919
 1st Wing, 27 September 1919
 1st Surveillance Group, c. 12 November 1919
 Eighth Corps Area, June 1922 (attached to 1st Cavalry Division)
 2nd Division Air Service (later 2nd Division Aviation), 24 March 1923 (attached to 1st Cavalry Division until June 1926)
 Eighth Corps area, 15 February 1929 (attached to 2nd Division)
 3rd Attack Group, 8 May 1929 (attached to 2nd Division until 1 October 1930, then to 12th Observation Group)
 12th Observation Group, 31 October 1931
 Eighth Corps Area, 1 March 1935 (attached to 12th Observation Group until 1 June 1937)
 Third Corps Area, 20 June 1937 (attached to Coast Artillery School)
 Coast Artillery School, c. 1939
 I Air Support Command, 1 September 1941 (attached to Coast Artillery School)
 73rd Observation Group, 12 March 1942 (attached to Coast Artillery School until 5 April 1942)
 Second Air Force, 12 August 1942 (attached to II Ground Air Support Command)
 IV Ground Air Support Command (later IV Air Support Command), 7 September 1942 (attached to II Ground Air Support Command (later II Air Support Command) until 23 September 1942)
 Army Air Forces School of Applied Tactics, 21 January 1943
 Air Support Department, AAF School of Applied Tactics (later, Tactical Air Force, AAF Tactical Center), 18 February 1943 (attached to 432nd Observation Group (later 432 Reconnaissance Group 432 Tactical Reconnaissance Group), 27 Mar – 1 November 1943)
 Tactical Air Division, AAF Tactical Center, 4 January 1944
 Orlando Fighter Wing, 20 February 1944
 AAF Tactical Center, 28 March–2 July 1944
 26th Strategic Reconnaissance Wing, 28 May 1952 – 1 July 1958
 Pacific Air Forces, 5 April 1968 (not organized)
 14th Air Commando Wing (later 14 Special Operations Wing), 1 May 1968 – 15 September 1969
 3rd Tactical Fighter Wing, 15 May 1976
 6200 Tactical Fighter Training Group, 1 January 1980 – 30 September 1991
 16th Operations Group (later 1st Special Operations Group), 28 October 2005 – present

Stations

 Ourches Aerodrome, France, 4 April 1918
 Detachment at Flin, France, 15–28 June 1918
 Saints Aerodrome, France, 29 June 1918
 Detachment at Ourches Aerodrome, France, until c. mid-July 1918
 Francheville Aerodrome, France, 9 July 1918
 Ferme de Moras Aerodrome, France, c. 25 July 1918
 Lizy-sur-Ourcq, France, c. 4 August 1918
 Coincy Aerodrome, France, c. 10 August 1918
 Chailly-en-Brie, France, 13 August 1918
 Toul, France, 24 August 1918
 Remicourt Aerodrome, France, 19 September 1918
 Julvecourt Aerodrome, France, 3 November 1918
 Vavincourt Aerodrome, France, c. 28 November 1918
 Colombey-les-Belles Aerodrome, France, c. 5 May 1919
 Port of embarkation, France, May–June 1919

 Garden City, New York, c. 20 June – 3 July 1919
 Fort Bliss, Texas, 27 September 1919
 Kelly Field, Texas, 2 July 1921
 Fort Bliss, Texas, 24 June 1922
 Fort Sam Houston, Texas, 22 June 1926
 Brooks Field, Texas, 31 October 1931
 Langley Field, Virginia, 20 June 1937
 Desert Training Center (Camp Cooke Airfield), California, 22 April 1942
 Blythe Army Air Base, California, 30 May 1942
 Keystone Army Airfield, Florida, 21 January 1943
 Alachua Army Airfield, Florida, 3 February 1944
 Orlando Army Air Base, Florida, 6 Mar – 2 July 1944
 Lockbourne Air Force Base, Ohio, 28 May 1952 – 1 July 1958
 Nha Trang Air Base, South Vietnam, 1 May 1968 – 15 September 1969
 Camp O'Donnell, Philippines, 15 May 1976 – 30 September 1991
 Nellis Air Force Base, Nevada, 28 October 2005
 Cannon Air Force Base, New Mexico, 1 June 2008 – present

Aircraft

 Included B-10, L-2, and apparently 0–25 and 0–43 during years 1937–1942
 North American O-47, c. 1938–1942
 Stinson L-1 Vigilant, 1941–1942
 O-52 Owl, 1941–1942
 L-4 Grasshopper, 1942
 P-39 Airacobra, 1943–1944
 A-20 Havoc, 1943
 DB-7 Boston, 1943

 L-2 Grasshopper, 1943
 L-3 Grasshopper, 1943
 YRB-47 Stratojet, 1953–1954
 RB-47 Stratojet, 1954–1958
 B-47 Stratojet, 1958
 AC-47 Spooky, 1968–1969
 MQ-1 Predator, 2005 – present
 MQ-9 Reaper, 2014–present

Notable former members
 John Levitow

References
 Notes

Bibliography
 
 
 
 
  

3 0003
Indian Springs, Nevada
003